PJBF is a registered body U/S 32 of the Companies Ordinance 1984 of Pakistan. The Forum has been granted a license from Securities and Exchange Commission of Pakistan, Company Registration Office, Karachi.

The Pakistan-Japan Business Forum was established on February 06, 2001 in the presence of dignitaries from Pakistan and Japan for the promotion of business between the two countries. It has currently 135 member companies.

About PJBF
Pakistan Japan Business was launched on February 6, 2001 at a grand ceremony at Consulate General of Japan's official residence in Karachi.

The launching ceremony was attended by Mohammad Mian Soomro- Governor of Sindh, Mr. Abdul Razak Dawood – Federal Minister of Commerce, Industries and Production, Mrs. Shahida Jamil – Minister of Law & Justice, Mr. Sadaaki Numata – Ambassador of Japan, Mr. Akira Watari – Chairman of Japan - Pakistan business co-operation committee and Mr. Kazumi Dekiba – Consul General of Japan.

The ceremony was presided by the Chief Patron and Ambassador Of Japan in Pakistan His Excellency Mr. Numata. Mr.Razak Dawood, Federal Minister of Commerce, Industries and Production, was the chief guest.

PJBF aim is to encourage, further and promote business, mutual understanding, and friendly relationships between the industrial and business communities of Pakistan and Japan. To promote Joint Ventures, initiate partnerships, provide technical expertise and organize training and seminars in close collaboration with Japan External Trade Organization & Association for Technical Scholarship. Arrange visits of industrialist and entrepreneurs of the two countries in cooperation with both governments and relevant organizations and institutions.

PJBF also provides a channel of communication and networking within the business community, and between the Forums and both Governments to promote the culture, traditions, arts and craft, and knowledge of the two countries. It is conceived to be a milestone to help activate business and investment relations between the two countries. It will generate momentum that would further accelerate business activities, since its main objectives are encouragement, furtherance and promotion of business, mutual understanding, and pragmatic friendly relations between Pakistan and Japan.

Directors

Kantaro Sonoura Appreciated PJBF Efforts
Special Advisor to then Japanese Prime Minister and President of the LDP, H.E. Mr. ABE Shinzo, H.E. Mr. Kentaro Sonoura visited Karachi in Dec 2019 and appreciated the efforts of PJBF for the Promotion of economic relations between Japan and Pakistan.

PJBF Received Commendation From the Government of Japan
Japanese government has awarded Pakistan Japan Business Forum, Foreign Minister’s Commendation’ in recognition of its services for Promotion of economic relations between Japan and Pakistan.The award ceremony in PJBF’s honour was held on Tuesday September 04, 2018 by Consul General H.E. Toshikazu Isomura at Japan House, Karachi. Praising the efforts of PBJF, the Consul General said the two countries befitted tremendously through the services of the forum and the Japanese government appreciates this contribution.

Chairman-CEO, PJBF decorated with The Order of the Rising Sun, Gold Rays with Neck Ribbon

Japanese Government has conferred the prestigious decoration, The Order of the Rising Sun, Gold Rays with Neck Ribbon to PJBF Chairman's, Mr. Abdul Kader Jaffer and Mr. Sohail P. Ahmed, in recognition of their dedicated contributions for promoting the mutual understanding and business ties between Pakistan and Japan. Both are the proud recipients of awards from Consulate General of Japan as well.

Kimihide Ando & Akira Yamamura decorated with Sitara-e-Pakistan

President of the Islamic Republic of Pakistan conferred the award of Sitara-e-Pakistan to Vice Chairman, PJBF, Mr. Kimihide Ando on March 23, 2018, for his great services in support of the Pakistan and to the cause of business and Foreign Direct Investment in Pakistan. Similarly in 2001 President of the Islamic Republic of Pakistan conferred the award of Sitara-e-Pakistan to Akira Yamamura one of the founder member of PJBF on his role in promoting trade between Pakistan and Japan. Akira Yamamura served as General Manager of Mitsubishi Pakistan for 13 ½ years and was responsible for arranging 4 JV between Pakistan and Japan.The Japanese government also awarded Yamamura with the Ministry of International Trade and Industry Award in 1996 and the Foreign Minister's Award in 2000 for his contribution to advancing economic and technological progress in a foreign country.

Golden Jubilee Celebrations of Diplomatic relations 

In 2002 Pakistan and Japan celebrated 50 years of establishment of Diplomatic relations between both the countries. In this respect GOJ allocated substantial resources to celebrate the occasion. PJBf arranged for a billboard, which was erected near Karachi airport to highlight the celebrations. PJBF also distributed the printed T-shirts.

In 2012 PJBF organized an Exclusive Grand Evening to celebrated the 60 years of Pakistan Japan Diplomatic relations followed by an exhibition of artifacts of Japan. PJBF arranged the publication of specials supplements in leading news papers on this eve.

See also

Japan - Pakistan business co-operation committee
Japan External Trade Organization
Federation of Pakistan Chamber of Commerce & Industry
Board of Investment
Japan Business Federation

External links
 Pakistan Japan Business Forum
 Consulate-General of Japan at Karachi
 Embassy of Japan in Pakistan
 JETRO Pakistan
 Board of Investment, Govt. of Pakistan
 Pakistan B2B Trade Portal
 Tokyo Chamber of Commerce and Industry

Japan–Pakistan relations
Foreign trade of Pakistan